The Ontario Warriors were a team in American Indoor Football that played in 2012.  Based in Ontario, California, the Warriors played their home games at Citizens Business Bank Arena.

The Warriors were the first men's indoor football team to play out of the city of Ontario, and the second in the Inland Empire, following the San Bernardino Bucking Bulls of the National Indoor Football League which played in 2007 before the team and league folded. (The Warriors were also preceded by the Los Angeles Temptation, who relocated to the Inland Empire in fall 2011.)

Season-by-season

|-
|2012 || 7 || 0 || 0 || colspan=2|Won the Division
|-

References

External links
 Ontario Warriors official website
 American Indoor Football official Website

American football teams in California
Former American Indoor Football teams
Sports in Ontario, California
Sports in San Bernardino County, California
American football teams established in 2012
American football teams disestablished in 2012
2012 establishments in California
2012 disestablishments in California